New York State Route 236 (NY 236) is a north–south state highway located within the town of Halfmoon in Saratoga County, New York, in the United States. The highway is little more than a connector linking U.S. Route 9 (US 9) to NY 146 while bypassing the intersection of the two routes to the south and east. The southern terminus of NY 236 is at an intersection with US 9 and the northern terminus is at a junction with NY 146.

Route description

NY 236 begins at an intersection with US 9 (Halfmoon Parkway) in the town of Halfmoon. The highway progresses northward, through the short commercial districts around Halfmoon, intersecting with County Route 94 (CR 94, named Guideboard Road). After Guideboard Road, NY 236 becomes more residentially developed, progressing to the northeast. North of downtown Halfmoon, the highway intersects with the western terminus of CR 95 (Harris Road) and passes to the west of Harris Park. The route turns northward and enters Newtown, where the NY 236 designation terminates at an intersection with NY 146.

History
NY 236 was constructed by the state of New York in the late 1940s. The southern half of the route used a new highway constructed on a largely undeveloped right-of-way while the north half was built over a preexisting local road. Several curves in the original highway were eliminated as part of NY 236's construction. The NY 236 designation was assigned to the new road on January 1, 1949.

Major intersections

See also

References

External links

236
Transportation in Saratoga County, New York